This is a list of historic country estates in Lake County, Ohio built between the years 1895 and 1930. Around 1885 the city of Cleveland, Ohio was home to an estimated 70 millionaires. While, at the same time, within three mile radius of the city of Willoughby in neighboring Lake Co. there were none, however, by 1918 there were then over 30 millionaires using large estates as their summer homes.

This wave of wealthy families migrating out to Lake County had many causes.  As James Borchert wrote in the Encyclopedia of Cleveland History

Electrified streetcar development in the late 1880s transformed the metropolis. Three times faster than horse-drawn streetcars (15 vs. 5 mph), they permitted radial suburban development up to 10(–20) miles from the city center. The new technology arrived as Cleveland confronted a series of challenges: huge migrations from Southern and Eastern Europe; industrial and business expansion into residential neighborhoods; pollution from new industries; and corrupt government. Urbanites looked to the suburbs as both rural haven and escape from urban disorder. Unlike previous suburban developments, streetcar suburbs deliberately distanced themselves from the city. Privately owned, franchised electric streetcar companies (often controlled by land developers) laid out tracks on EUCLID AVE.

This resulted in bringing major changes to the county's westernmost villages and townships.

On the front page of the Painesville Telegraph dated Thursday, April 16, 1903, under the heading "Mentor Real Estate" was the following.

Demand For Good Residence property has put up the price.
Few people are aware that real estate in Mentor is worth several times as much as in Painesville. The demand, by prominent Cleveland people, for residence property along the C. P. & E. railway is what has put prices up on Mentor real estate, and now $1,000 an acre is considered cheap in many instances.
The improvements, which Clevelander people have made and are making on the lands which they have purchased, has also had much to do with advance in price.  In 1892 real estate in Mentor was no higher than here, but since the construction of the electric railway, prices have gone steadlly  upward.

Map of estates' locations 
The country estates were so densely packed into the western portion of Lake County that you could walk from the ReedHurst Estate on the Panesville-Mentor Line to Hillandale on the Wickliffe-Euclid line, a distance of some 12 miles, staying entirely on estate's property with only the need to occasionally cross a country dirt road.

{
"type": "FeatureCollection", "features":  [
{
      "type": "Feature",
      "properties": {
        "title": " Arthur H. Hawgood",
        "marker-symbol": "-number",
        "marker-color": "302060"
      },
      "geometry": {
        "type": "Point",
        "coordinates": [-81.2805484,41.6969053] }} ,
{
      "type": "Feature",
      "properties": {
        "title": " Cherry Farms-Frank W. Hart",
        "marker-symbol": "-number",
        "marker-color": "302060"
      },
      "geometry": {
        "type": "Point",
        "coordinates": [ -81.28533, 41.694136 ] }} ,
{
      "type": "Feature",
      "properties": {
        "title": " Old Orchard Farm-William Silverthorn",
        "marker-symbol": "-number",
        "marker-color": "302060"
      },
      "geometry": {
        "type": "Point",
        "coordinates": [ -81.28628, 41.692452 ] }} ,
{
      "type": "Feature",
      "properties": {
        "title": " [James C. Parmelee",
        "marker-symbol": "-number",
        "marker-color": "302060"
      },
      "geometry": {
        "type": "Point",
        "coordinates": [ -81.2982295,41.6968252 ] }} ,
{
      "type": "Feature",
      "properties": {
        "title": " 'Captain Joseph Gilchrist Estate",
        "marker-symbol": "-number",
        "marker-color": "302060"
      },
      "geometry": {
        "type": "Point",
        "coordinates": [ -81.2991492, 41.6809528 ] }} ,
{
      "type": "Feature",
      "properties": {
        "title": " Readhurst-Frederick Nicholas Reed",
        "marker-symbol": "-number",
        "marker-color": "302060"
      },
      "geometry": {
        "type": "Point",
        "coordinates": [ -81.298215, 41.674412 ] }} ,
{
      "type": "Feature",
      "properties": {
        "title": " Twin Maples-Luther L. Cook,Authur H. Hawgood,Edmund H. Luetkemeyer",
        "marker-symbol": "-number",
        "marker-color": "302060"
      },
      "geometry": {
        "type": "Point",
        "coordinates": [ -81.303725, 41.678681 ] }} ,
{
      "type": "Feature",
      "properties": {
      "title": "Henry W. Corning",
        "marker-symbol": "-number",
        "marker-color": "302060"
      },
      "geometry": {
        "type": "Point",
        "coordinates": [-81.308979, 41.676969 ] }},
{
      "type": "Feature",
      "properties": {
      "title": "Dellhurst-Herman B. Van Cleve Later Harvey H. Brown",
        "marker-symbol": "-number",
        "marker-color": "302060"
      },
      "geometry": {
        "type": "Point",
        "coordinates": [-81.322259, 41.676676 ] }},
{
      "type": "Feature",
      "properties": {
      "title": "Shulters Farm - Hoyt Volney Shulters",
        "marker-symbol": "-number",
        "marker-color": "302060"
      },
      "geometry": {
        "type": "Point",
        "coordinates": [-81.321020, 41.671097 ] }},
{
      "type": "Feature",
      "properties": {
      "title": "Meadowlawn - Andre Tozfer Chisholm",
        "marker-symbol": "-number",
        "marker-color": "302060"
      },
      "geometry": {
        "type": "Point",
        "coordinates": [-81.322301, 41.670504 ] }},
{
      "type": "Feature",
      "properties": {
        "title": " William Parmalee Murray",
        "marker-symbol": "-number",
        "marker-color": "302060"
      },
      "geometry": {
        "type": "Point",
        "coordinates": [ -81.337266, 41.668281 ] }} ,
{ "type": "Feature",
      "properties": {
      "title": "Leonard B. Miller",
        "marker-symbol": "-number",
        "marker-color": "302060" },
      "geometry": {
        "type": "Point",
        "coordinates": [ -81.34772, 41.663612 ] }},
{
      "type": "Feature",
      "properties": {
        "title": "Indian Hill-John E. Newell",
        "marker-symbol": "-number",
        "marker-color": "302060"
      },
      "geometry": {
        "type": "Point",
        "coordinates": [-81.356571, 41.665116 ] }} ,
{ "type": "Feature",
      "properties": {
      "title": "Wellcomfield-Samuel T. Wellman. (Later) Goodhold Farm-Liberty E. Holden",
        "marker-symbol": "-number",
        "marker-color": "302060" },
      "geometry": {
        "type": "Point",
        "coordinates": [ -81.363854, 41.66226 ] }},
{
      "type": "Feature",
      "properties": {
        "title": "",
        "marker-symbol": "-number",
        "marker-color": "302060"
      },
      "geometry": {
        "type": "Point",
        "coordinates": [ -81.357707, 41.639772 ] }},
 {
      "type": "Feature",
      "properties": {
        "title": "Kingwood Farm-Harry Wheelock King",
        "marker-symbol": "-number",
        "marker-color": "302060"
      },
      "geometry": {
        "type": "Point",
        "coordinates": [ -81.343129, 41.644026 ] }},
{ "type": "Feature",
      "properties": {
      "title": "Primerose Hill-Horce E. Andrews later Nortonwood-David Z. Norton",
        "marker-symbol": "-number",
        "marker-color": "302060" },
      "geometry": {
        "type": "Point",
      "coordinates": [ -81.3493322, 41.651101] }},
{
      "type": "Feature",
      "properties": {
        "title": " Bolton Estate-Charles Chester Bolton",
        "marker-symbol": "-number",
        "marker-color": "302060"
      },
      "geometry": {
        "type": "Point",
        "coordinates": [ -81.342463, 41.650702 ] }} ,
{
      "type": "Feature",
      "properties": {
        "title": " Bolton Estate-Newell C. Bolton",
        "marker-symbol": "-number",
        "marker-color": "302060"
      },
      "geometry": {
        "type": "Point",
        "coordinates": [ -81.33671, 41.654937 ] }} , 
{
      "type": "Feature",
      "properties": {
      "title": "Low Ridge Farm-Jacob B. Perkins",
        "marker-symbol": "-number",
        "marker-color": "302060"
      },
      "geometry": {
        "type": "Point",
        "coordinates": [-81.321433, 41.659076 ] }},
{
      "type": "Feature",
      "properties": {
      "title": "Wildwood-John G. Oliver",
        "marker-symbol": "-number",
        "marker-color": "302060"
      },
      "geometry": {
        "type": "Point",
        "coordinates": [-81.324237, 41.66083 ] }},

{
      "type": "Feature",
      "properties": {
        "title": " Chesterfield-Frank A. Scott (later) Greystone Manor-Tom M. Girdler",
        "marker-symbol": "-number",
        "marker-color": "302060"
      },
      "geometry": {
        "type": "Point",
        "coordinates": [ -81.335074, 41.647701 ] }} ,
{
      "type": "Feature",
      "properties": {
        "title": " Hoyt, Elton James",
        "marker-symbol": "-number",
        "marker-color": "302060"
      },
      "geometry": {
        "type": "Point",
        "coordinates": [ -81.329406, 41.644256 ] }} ,
{
      "type": "Feature",
      "properties": {
        "title": "",
        "marker-symbol": "-number",
        "marker-color": "302060"
      },
      "geometry": {
        "type": "Point",
        "coordinates": [ -81.319702, 41.641239 ] }},
{
      "type": "Feature",
      "properties": {
        "title": " Shady Brook-Arthur D. Baldwin",
        "marker-symbol": "-number",
        "marker-color": "302060"
      },
      "geometry": {
        "type": "Point",
        "coordinates": [ -81.29767, 41.637464 ] }} ,
{
      "type": "Feature",
      "properties": {
        "title": " Manor House Farm-Charles Rockwell Morley",
        "marker-symbol": "-number",
        "marker-color": "302060"
      },
      "geometry": {
        "type": "Point",
        "coordinates": [-81.278562, 41.651042 ] }} ,
{
      "type": "Feature",
      "properties": {
        "title": " The Pinery - Ralph King",
        "marker-symbol": "-number",
        "marker-color": "302060"
      },
      "geometry": {
        "type": "Point",
        "coordinates": [-81.27856,41.641137 ] }} ,
{
      "type": "Feature",
      "properties": {
        "title": " Robera Holden Bole",
        "marker-symbol": "-number",
        "marker-color": "302060"
      },
      "geometry": {
        "type": "Point",
        "coordinates": [ -81.301963, 41.619654 ] }} ,
{
      "type": "Feature",
      "properties": {
       "title": "Stump Hollow Farm-Howard Melville Hanna",
        "marker-symbol": "-number",
        "marker-color": "302060"
      },
      "geometry": {
        "type": "Point",
        "coordinates": [ -81.317272, 41.623819 ] }} ,
{
      "type": "Feature",
      "properties": {
       "title": "Holiday Hill Farm-George M. Humphrey",
        "marker-symbol": "-number",
        "marker-color": "302060"
      },
      "geometry": {
        "type": "Point",
        "coordinates": [-81.319997, 41.628843 ] }} ,
{
      "type": "Feature",
      "properties": {
        "title": " Lantern Court-Warren H. Corning",
        "marker-symbol": "-number",
        "marker-color": "302060"
      },
      "geometry": {
        "type": "Point",
        "coordinates": [ -81.31164, 41.601845 ] }} ,
{
      "type": "Feature",
      "properties": {
        "title": " Playmore Estate-Benjamin S Hubbell",
        "marker-symbol": "-number",
        "marker-color": "302060"
      },
      "geometry": {
        "type": "Point",
        "coordinates": [ -81.321296, 41.604093 ] }} ,
{
      "type": "Feature",
      "properties": {
        "title": " Halle Farm-Samuel H. Halle",
        "marker-symbol": "-number",
        "marker-color": "302060"
      },
      "geometry": {
        "type": "Point",
        "coordinates": [ -81.33422, 41.610683 ] }} ,
{
      "type": "Feature",
      "properties": {
        "title": " 310 Acres - Henry A. Everett ",
        "marker-symbol": "-number",
        "marker-color": "302060"
      },
      "geometry": {
        "type": "Point",
        "coordinates": [ -81.361171, 41.599412 ] }} ,
{
      "type": "Feature",
      "properties": {
        "title": " Russellhurst-Dr. George C. Russell",
        "marker-symbol": "-number",
        "marker-color": "302060"
      },
      "geometry": {
        "type": "Point",
        "coordinates": [ -81.358932, 41.618554 ] }} ,
{
      "type": "Feature",
      "properties": {
        "title": "Ellsworth Hunt Augustus",
        "marker-symbol": "-number",
        "marker-color": "302060"
      },
      "geometry": {
        "type": "Point",
        "coordinates": [ -81.380884,  41.614248] }} ,
{
      "type": "Feature",
      "properties": {
        "title": " Leo Doro Farms-Henry A. Everett ",
        "marker-symbol": "-number",
        "marker-color": "302060"
      },
      "geometry": {
        "type": "Point",
        "coordinates": [ -81.377312, 41.631618 ] }} ,
{
      "type": "Feature",
      "properties": {
        "title": " Winden-Henry A. Sherwin",
        "marker-symbol": "-number",
        "marker-color": "302060"
      },
      "geometry": {
        "type": "Point",
        "coordinates": [ -81.3892847, 41.630388 ] }} ,
{
      "type": "Feature",
      "properties": {
      "title": "Osborne Farm-Francis Marion Osborne",
        "marker-symbol": "-number",
        "marker-color": "302060"
      },
      "geometry": {
        "type": "Point",
        "coordinates": [-81.3986468, 41.6805925 ] }},
{
      "type": "Feature",
      "properties": {
      "title": "Harkness, Stephen V. and Anna M.",
        "marker-symbol": "-number",
        "marker-color": "302060"
      },
      "geometry": {
        "type": "Point",
        "coordinates": [-81.444572, 41.671199 ] }},
{
      "type": "Feature",
      "properties": {
      "title": "Cozy Bank - Dr Gustave E. Carl Weber",
        "marker-symbol": "-number",
        "marker-color": "302060"
      },
      "geometry": {
        "type": "Point",
        "coordinates": [-81.441508, 41.670355 ] }},
{
      "type": "Feature",
      "properties": {
      "title": "Joseph H. Boyce - Later Van Gorder Manor- A. H. Van Gorder",
        "marker-symbol": "-number",
        "marker-color": "302060"
      },
      "geometry": {
        "type": "Point",
        "coordinates": [-81.4109006, 41.6338697 ] }},
{
      "type": "Feature",
      "properties": {
        "title": " Belle Vernon Farm-Jacob A. Beidler",
        "marker-symbol": "-number",
        "marker-color": "302060"
      },
      "geometry": {
        "type": "Point",
        "coordinates": [ -81.419989, 41.6280533 ] }},
{
      "type": "Feature",
      "properties": {
        "title": " Elgercon-Harrison T. Chandler, Later Stanly W. Tucker",
        "marker-symbol": "-number",
        "marker-color": "302060"
      },
      "geometry": {
        "type": "Point",
        "coordinates": [ -81.422342, 41.622858 ] }},
{
      "type": "Feature",
      "properties": {
        "title": " Willoughby Hall-Thomas Jopling",
        "marker-symbol": "-number",
        "marker-color": "302060"
      },
      "geometry": {
        "type": "Point",
        "coordinates": [  -81.425417, 41.617198 ] }},
{
      "type": "Feature",
      "properties": {
        "title": " As You Like It - William J. Haworth later George B. Harris",
        "marker-symbol": "-number",
        "marker-color": "302060"
      },
      "geometry": {
        "type": "Point",
        "coordinates": [ -81.43625, 41.610809 ] }},
{
      "type": "Feature",
      "properties": {
        "title": " Drury Lane-Francis E. Drury",
        "marker-symbol": "-number",
        "marker-color": "302060"
      },
      "geometry": {
        "type": "Point",
        "coordinates": [ -81.404232, 41.614932 ] }} ,
{
      "type": "Feature",
      "properties": {
        "title": " Tannenbum Farm-Charles A. Otis Jr.",
        "marker-symbol": "-number",
        "marker-color": "302060"
      },
      "geometry": {
        "type": "Point",
        "coordinates": [ -81.402445, 41.619775 ] }} ,
{
      "type": "Feature",
      "properties": {
        "title": " South Farm-John Sherwin",
        "marker-symbol": "-number",
        "marker-color": "302060"
      },
      "geometry": {
        "type": "Point",
        "coordinates": [ -81.3971272, 41.614845 ] }} ,
{
      "type": "Feature",
      "properties": {
        "title": " Treadway Farm-Annie W. Treadway",
        "marker-symbol": "-number",
        "marker-color": "302060"
      },
      "geometry": {
        "type": "Point",
        "coordinates": [ -81.398357, 41.606694 ] }} ,
{
      "type": "Feature",
      "properties": {
        "title": " River Farm Estate,(Squire's Castle)-Feargus B. Squire",
        "marker-symbol": "-number",
        "marker-color": "302060"
      },
      "geometry": {
        "type": "Point",
        "coordinates": [ -81.420945, 41.580144 ] }} ,
{
      "type": "Feature",
      "properties": {
        "title": "Blakeslee Estate",
        "marker-symbol": "-number",
        "marker-color": "302060"
      },
      "geometry": {
        "type": "Point",
        "coordinates": [ -81.424128, 41.58819 ] }} ,
{
      "type": "Feature",
      "properties": {
        "title": "Sleepy Hollow Farm-Howard Melville Hanna",
        "marker-symbol": "-number",
        "marker-color": "302060"
      },
      "geometry": {
        "type": "Point",
        "coordinates": [ -81.431607,  41.597247 ] }} ,
{
      "type": "Feature",
      "properties": {
        "title": " Spring Grove Farm-Martin Snider (later) Salmon Portland Chase Halle",
        "marker-symbol": "-number",
        "marker-color": "302060"
      },
      "geometry": {
        "type": "Point",
        "coordinates": [ -81.441959,  41.607975 ] }} ,
{
      "type": "Feature",
      "properties": {
        "title": " Nagirroc-James Corrigan",
        "marker-symbol": "-number",
        "marker-color": "302060"
      },
      "geometry": {
        "type": "Point",
        "coordinates": [ -81.449508, 41.606661 ] }},
{
      "type": "Feature",
      "properties": {
        "title": " Dr. William H. Humiston",
        "marker-symbol": "-number",
        "marker-color": "302060"
      },
      "geometry": {
        "type": "Point",
        "coordinates": [-81.448014, 41.584898] }},
{
      "type": "Feature",
      "properties": {
        "title": "Justamere Farm-Joseph R. Nutt",
        "marker-symbol": "-number",
        "marker-color": "302060"
      },
      "geometry": {
        "type": "Point",
        "coordinates": [-81.453947,41.605879 ] }},
{
      "type": "Feature",
      "properties": {
        "title": " Wickliffe-on-the-Bluff - David Edward Dangler",
        "marker-symbol": "-number",
        "marker-color": "302060"
      },
      "geometry": {
        "type": "Point",
        "coordinates": [ -81.4571575, 41.6069531 ] }} ,
{
      "type": "Feature",
      "properties": {
        "title": " Lakeland-Frank Rockefeller",
        "marker-symbol": "-number",
        "marker-color": "302060"
      },
      "geometry": {
        "type": "Point",
        "coordinates": [ -81.463357,  41.600027 ] }} ,
{
      "type": "Feature",
      "properties": {
        "title": " George Arthur Armington",
        "marker-symbol": "-number",
        "marker-color": "302060"
      },
      "geometry": {
        "type": "Point",
        "coordinates": [ -81.469317,  41.602190 ] }} ,
{
      "type": "Feature",
      "properties": {
        "title": " ",
        "marker-symbol": "-number",
        "marker-color": "302060"
      },
      "geometry": {
        "type": "Point",
        "coordinates": [ -81.479318, 41.597854 ] }} ,

{
      "type": "Feature",
      "properties": {
        "title": "",
        "marker-symbol": "-number",
        "marker-color": "302060"
      },
      "geometry": {
        "type": "Point",
        "coordinates": [ -81.478431, 41.59474 ] }},
{
      "type": "Feature",
      "properties": {
        "title": "Elmhurst-William C. Talmage",
        "marker-symbol": "-number",
        "marker-color": "302060"
      },
      "geometry": {
        "type": "Point",
        "coordinates": [ -81.4795695, 41.5955126 ] }},
{
      "type": "Feature",
      "properties": {
        "title": "Edwin R. Perkins",
        "marker-symbol": "-number",
        "marker-color": "302060"
      },
      "geometry": {
        "type": "Point",
        "coordinates": [ -81.488753,41.598108 ] }},
{
      "type": "Feature",
      "properties": {
        "title": "Ridgemere Farm - G. W. Cady later Price McKinney",
        "marker-symbol": "-number",
        "marker-color": "302060"
      },
      "geometry": {
        "type": "Point",
        "coordinates": [ -81.481306, 41.595150 ] }},
{
      "type": "Feature",
      "properties": {
        "title": "Nutwood Farm-Julius E. French",
        "marker-symbol": "-number",
        "marker-color": "302060"
      },
      "geometry": {
        "type": "Point",
        "coordinates": [ -81.483229, 41.593536 ] }},
{
      "type": "Feature",
      "properties": {
        "title": "Hillandale-Joseph Outhwaite (later) Tremaine-Burton Tremaine",
        "marker-symbol": "-number",
        "marker-color": "302060"
      },
      "geometry": {
        "type": "Point",
        "coordinates": [ -81.48737, 41.592133 ] }}

  ] }

Estate details (64 of 68)

Historical events and the history of Cleveland (1895–1960) 

 1885: John D. Rockefeller and Standard Oil Headquarters move to NYC
 1895: The C.P & E. Interurban Line extends into Lake Co. (See Interurban Growth.)
 1910: The Rise of the automobile. By the late 1920s, rubber-tired competition caused the decline of Cleveland-area interurbans, which were dying from lack of ridership. Already the weakest ones had folded, the Cleveland, Youngstown & Eastern abandoned its operations in 1925, and the Cleveland, Painesville & Eastern quit a year later. General Motors streetcar conspiracy
 1913: The introduction of the Federal income tax
 1929: Wall Street Crash of 1929
 1932: Failure of several major Cleveland banks
 The decline of major companies headquartered in Cleveland
 1959: Interstate 90 in Ohio (I-90) is built through western Lake Co.

By 1959 some estates were already past their prime when the planners of Interstate 90 working in the ODOT District 12 headquarters would decide to follow the same natural ridge Line that the wealthy owners and their architects had themselves once coveted to gain a panoramic view over the valley of east branch of the Chagrin River. It was this combination of open fields and horse pastures that skirted just north of Chagrin River watershed, the higher peak of Little Mountain and the cities of Wait Hill, Kirtland, Kirtland Hills but was still south enough of the nearby dense properties in the cities of Wickliffe, Willoughby, and Mentor that made this route so attractive to those freeway planners. In some cases estates like Mooreland, Justamere Farm, Nutwood Farm were sliced in half while Mansion's like Tannenbum, Greystone Manor or Hoyt's Estate were so close you could now wave to passing motorist from their bedroom windows and still others even less fortunate like Hillandale, Winden and Kingwood were eventually demolished.

References 
 Note: References using The Cleveland Plain Dealer can be accessed for free using a Cuyahoga County Library card.

Further reading 
 Cleveland in the Gilded Age (A Stroll Down Millionaires Row) Dan Ruminski & Alan Dutka
 Cleveland's Millionaires's Row, Alan F. Dutka
 
 

Lists of buildings and structures in Ohio
1899 establishments in Ohio
1903 establishments in Ohio
1910 establishments in Ohio
1920 establishments in Ohio